Dornenreich  (up to Bitter ist's dem Tod zu dienen known as DornenReich) is an Austrian melodic black metal band, founded in 1996. Alongside their initial metal sound, Dornenreich also regard their music as being neofolk influenced. They have released eight  albums on Prophecy Productions.

History
Thomas "Valñes" Stock founded the band in 1996 and choose "Dornenreich" as the name due to the various possible interpretations ("Realm of thorns" or "Full of thorns"). Jochen "Evíga" Stock joined the band during 1996 and they started to write the first songs. In April 1997 Moritz "Gilvan" Neuner completed the line-up but left after the release of Her von welken Nächten. Four years after this, the album Hexenwind was released. Originally, it was planned to be a double album, together with the latter released Durch den Traum. Thomas Stock quit the band in April 2006 to concentrate on his musical project "Eyas". Jochen Stock confirmed that Thomas "Inve" Riesner would be the new member of the band. Riesner already played the violin on Her von welken Nächten. In 2007, Dornenreich played at Summer Breeze and documented this concert with ten cameras for the upcoming DVD Nachtreisen. After the album In Luft geritzt'''s release in 2008, the new album Flammentriebe will tie in with Her von welken Nächten.

Members
 Jochen Stock (a.k.a. Evíga) - vocals, guitars, acoustic guitar, bass, tambourine (1996—present)
 Moritz Neuner (a.k.a. Dragomir or Gilván) - percussion, drums (1997–2001, 2009—present)
 Thomas Riesner (a.k.a. Ínve) - violin (2006—present)

Former members
 Thomas Stock (a.k.a. Valñes or Dunkelkind) - vocals, keyboards (1996–2006)

DiscographyMein Flügelschlag (demo, 1997)Nicht um zu sterben (full-length, 1997)Bitter ist's dem Tod zu dienen (full-length, 1999)Her von welken Nächten (full-length, 2001)Hexenwind (full-length, 2005)Durch den Traum (full-length, 2006)In Luft geritzt (full-length, 2008)Whom the Moon a Nightsong Sings (compilation, various artists, 2010)
Flammentriebe (full-length, 2011)
Freiheit (full-length, 2014)
Schwellenklänge (box set compilation, 2018)
Du wilde Liebe sei (full-length, 2021)

References

External links

Last FM Page

Austrian black metal musical groups
Ambient music groups
Musical groups established in 1996
Musical quartets